The Deputy Chiefs of the Army Staff (DCOAS) are Principal Staff Officers (PSOs) of the Indian Army, and are three-star rank appointments held by Lieutenant-Generals. Currently the rank of DCOAS has three divisions:- Capability Development and Sustenance, Information Systems & Coordination and Strategy.

History
The position of Deputy Chief of Army Staff (DCOAS) was first established on 27 January 1959 as the second-in-command of the Indian Army after the Chief of Army Staff. It was equivalent to an Army Commander (GOC-in-C). Lt. Gen. M. S. Wadalia became the first DCOAS.

In January 1965, the position of Vice Chief of the Army Staff replaced the DCOAS in the role of second-in-command, with the DCOAS becoming a Principal Staff Officer (PSO) position, replacing the former position of Chief of the General Staff. 

The office of DCOAS was later bifurcated into :- Planning and Systems and Training and Coordination. The division of Training and Coordination was later renamed to Information Systems and Training.

In April 2021, the rank of Deputy Chief (Planning and Systems) was amended to Deputy Chief (Capability Development and Sustenance) and Deputy Chief (Information Systems and Training) to Deputy Chief (Information Systems and Coordination). A third post and new post of DCOAS Strategy was created.

Order of Precedence
The DCOAS rank at No. 24 on the Indian order of precedence, along with Vice-Admirals of the Indian Navy and Air Marshals of the Indian Air Force. Since they should not draw equivalent or more salary than the next higher level, the remuneration is capped at ₹2,24,000.

Current organisation
Currently, there are three DCOAS at Army HQ:
 Deputy Chief of Army Staff (Capability Development and Sustenance)
 Deputy Chief of the Army Staff (Information Systems and Coordination)
 Deputy Chief of Army Staff (Strategy)

Appointees

Deputy Chief of the Army Staff (1959-65)

Deputy Chief of the Army Staff (1965-1993)

Deputy Chief of Army Staff (Capability Development and Sustenance)
This officer takes care of all capital and revenue procurement. The Master General Sustenance (MGS), Director Generals (DG) of Ordnance, Electronics and Mechanical Engineers (EME), DG Infantry, DG Armoured, ADG Mechanised Infantry, DG Artillery, DG Air Defence and DG Capability Development report come under this office.

Deputy Chief of the Army Staff (Planning and Systems)

Deputy Chief of Army Staff (Capability Development and Sustenance)

Deputy Chief of Army Staff (Information Systems and Coordination)
The DG Signals, DG Information Systems and DG Staff Duty report to this office.

Deputy Chief of the Army Staff (Training and Coordination)

Deputy Chief of the Army Staff (Information Systems and Training)

Deputy Chief of the Army Staff (Information Systems and Coordination)

Deputy Chief of Army Staff (Strategy)
The Director General of Military Operations (DGMO), DG Military Intelligence, DG Operation Logistics and DG Information Warfare report to this office.

See also
 Vice Chief of the Army Staff
 Deputy Chief of the Naval Staff
 Deputy Chief of the Air Staff

Notes

References

Indian Army
Indian military appointments
Indian Army appointments